Jamie Mathieson (born 1970) is a British television screenwriter. A former stand-up comedian, he has written for a number of UK science fiction TV shows, namely Being Human, Dirk Gently, and for series 8, 9 and 10 of Doctor Who.

Career
He scripted the sci-fi comedy film Frequently Asked Questions About Time Travel, starring Chris O'Dowd, Dean Lennox Kelly, Marc Wootton, and Anna Faris. It was released in the UK and Ireland on 24 April 2009. He wrote the drama pilot ALT for Channel 4 in 2014, but was not picked up for series. However, he did create and write the sci-fi miniseries Tripped for E4.

It was announced in October 2014 that Mathieson will be the lead writer of French science fiction series Métal Hurlant: Origins, a sequel to Métal Hurlant Chronicles, which is currently in development.

Writing credits

References

External links
 Jamie Mathieson's Website
 Jamie Mathieson on Twitter
 

Living people
Place of birth missing (living people)
British science fiction writers
British television writers
English television writers
English screenwriters
English male screenwriters
British male television writers
1970 births
21st-century British screenwriters
21st-century English male writers